Charles Bowles may refer to:
Charles Bowles (mayor) (1884–1957), politician from Michigan, mayor of Detroit in 1930
Charles J. Bowles (1922–2005), American professor of physical education and human anatomy
Charles W. Bowles (1877–1966), British civil engineer 
Charlie Bowles (1917–2003), American baseball pitcher